Rose Colored Glasses is the debut studio album by country music artist John Conlee.  It was released in 1978 on ABC Records, and was his only disc for the label; he would move to MCA Records the next year.

The album was a commercial success, peaking just outside the country top 10 (at number 11), and would be his highest charting album until 1983.

It featured 3 singles; the Conlee-written title track reached number 5 in America. The next single, "Lady Lay Down" became a number one in the States, while going to number 2 in Canada. The last single to be released from the record, the Conlee-written "Backside of Thirty" (in 1979) was also an American number 1, while reaching number 5 in Canada. Among these singles, "Backside of Thirty" had originally been released in 1977, but it did not chart at the time.

Kurt Wolff and Orla Duane, in their book Country Music: The Rough Guide, described the album's cuts as "among Conlee's finest, including the title track and especially 'Backside of Thirty'."

Track listing
 "Rose Colored Glasses" (John Conlee, George Barber) – 3:18
 "Something Special" (Dave Loggins) – 2:36
 "I'll Be Easy" (John Conlee) – 1:55
 "Let Your Love Fall Back on Me" (Jonathan Lee) – 2:12
 "Backside of Thirty" (John Conlee) – 2:33
 "Lady Lay Down" (Don Cook, Rafe Van Hoy) – 3:05
 "She Loves My Troubles Away" (Rayburn Anthony, Max D. Barnes) – 2:28
 "Just Let It Slide" (A.L. "Doodle" Owens) – 2:47
 "Some Old California Memory" (A.L. "Doodle" Owens, Warren Robb) – 2:24
 "Hold On" (John Conlee, Dick Kent) – 2:45

Production
 Produced By Bud Logan
 Production Co-Ordination: Katie Gillon, Sherri Halford
 Engineers: Les Ladd, Bud Logan, Jack logan
 Mastering: Milan Bogdan, Glenn Meadows

References

1978 debut albums
ABC Records albums
John Conlee albums